Melaleuca holosericea is a plant in the myrtle family Myrtaceae which is endemic to the south-west of Western Australia. It is a small, rare shrub similar to other pink-flowered species in the Melaleuca scabra group.

Description
The leaves and branches are often covered with a dense covering of soft, silky hairs.

The pinkish flowers are arranged in heads up to  diameter at the ends of branches which continue to grow after flowering, each head containing between two and five groups of flowers in threes. The stamens are arranged in five bundles around the flower, each bundle containing between 7 and 9 stamens.

Taxonomy
Melaleuca holosericea was first formally described in 1844 by Johannes Conrad Schauer in Plantae Preissianae. The specific epithet (holosericea) is from Ancient Greek, meaning "entire, complete or whole" and "silk", referring to the silky hairs on the branches and leaves.

Distribution and habitat
This melaleuca occurs in the Clackline, Toodyay and Northam districts in the Avon Wheatbelt and Jarrah Forest biogeographic regions. It grows in sandy and gravelly soils on undulating plains and ridges.

Ecology
Melaleuca holosericea has been found to be resistant to Phytophthora cinnamomi

Conservation status
Melaleuca holosericea is listed as "not threatened" by the Government of Western Australia Department of Parks and Wildlife.

References

holosericea
Plants described in 1844
Endemic flora of Western Australia
Taxa named by Johannes Conrad Schauer